Sébastien Chabaud (born 9 March 1977 in Marseille, France) is a French former football player who used to play in the Belgian Jupiler League. His usual position was midfielder.

References 
Guardian Football

Teams 

1995-2000: AS Cannes
2000-2003: AS Nancy
2003-2006: Charleroi
2006-2007: Gimnàstic de Tarragona
2007-2008: Germinal Beerschot
2008–2010: Charleroi

1977 births
Living people
French footballers
AS Cannes players
AS Nancy Lorraine players
R. Charleroi S.C. players
La Liga players
Gimnàstic de Tarragona footballers
Beerschot A.C. players
Association football midfielders